The 1926 United States Senate election in North Dakota took place on November 2, 1926. Following his re-election in the special election earlier in the year, Senator Gerald Nye ran for re-election to a full term. Despite spurning the Republican Party's endorsement in the special election, Nye ran in the Republican primary in the regular election. On the same day that he defeated former Governor Louis B. Hanna in the special election—in which Hanna had the Republican nomination and Nye ran as the Nonpartisan League candidate—Nye defeated Hanna in the Republican primary for the regular election. Nye once again faced a crowded general election, but emerged victorious in a landslide, winning nearly 70% of the vote while none of his opponents exceeded 15%.

Democratic Primary

Candidates
 F. F. Burchard, high school teacher
 Halvor Halvorson (write-in)

Campaign
At the Democratic convention in Grand Forks, teacher F. F. Burchard was nominated by the state party as their candidate for the U.S. Senate. However, Halvor Halvorson challenged the decision of the state party to select its nominee at the convention and instead filed paperwork to be listed on the primary election ballot, arguing that there was a vacancy on the ballot that he was entitled to fill. The issue was taken to the state Supreme Court, which ruled against Halvorson, though it left open the question of whether Halvorson was allowed to file. Ultimately, however, the Secretary of State's office rejected Halvorson's petition, forcing him to run as a write-in candidate.

Results

Republican Primary

Candidates
 Gerald Nye, incumbent U.S. Senator
 Louis B. Hanna, former Governor of North Dakota
 C. P. Stone, businessman
 Herman N. Midtbo, perennial candidate

Results

Farmer–Labor Party primary

Candidates
 William Lemke
 Gerald Nye, incumbent U.S. Senator
 C. E. Erickson

Results

General election

Results

References

1926
North Dakota
United States Senate